Marco Aurelio Severino (November, 1580 – July 12, 1656) was an Italian surgeon and anatomist.

Biography

Severino was born in Tarsia (Calabria, Italy), of Giovanni Jacopo Severino, a lawyer. He died of plague in 1656 in Naples.

Adept of the atomist views of Democritus, he disregarded Aristotle. He met Tommaso Campanella and corresponded with William Harvey and Thomas Bartholin. He was familiar of the works of scientists of the antiquity like Galen and Lactantius.

He also was the author of a book called The philosophy of chess (La filosofia degli scacchi).

Controversy

Besides his brilliant career as a surgeon and professor, his works present an ambiguous aspect. He includes mystic speculations, and his work attempts to coincide with his religious beliefs.

Selected works

De recondita abscessuum natura, O. Beltrani, Naples, 1632
 . Frankfurt, 1643
 Zootomia democritaea, id est anatome generalis totius animantium opificii : libris quinque distincta, quorum seriem sequens facies delineabit. Nuremberg, 1645, in-40, 
 , Frankfurt, 1646
 De viperae natura, veneno, medicina demonstrationes et experimenta nova, P. Frambotti, Padua, 1650
 
 Trimembris chirurgia, Schönwetter, Frankfort, 1653
 , Naples, 1653 (With a commentary by Thomas Bartholin)
 Quaestiones anatomicae quatuor, Frankfort, 1654
 Antiperipatias. Hoc est adversus Aristoteleos de respiratione piscium diatriba. De piscibus in sicco viventibus commentarius... Phoca illustratus..., 2 vol., Naples, H. C. Cavalli, 1655–1659 (Includes a short biography)
 Synopseos chirurgiae libri sex, E. Weyerstroten, Amsterdam, 1664

Lists of works 
Severino gave us a list of his printed works and manuscripts, which is made up of nine parts and extends on four pages. It can be found in a 1653 edition Therapeuta Neapolitanus : .

This list  can also be consulted on http://gso.gbv.de/

External links 
 Biography, on the Galileo Project website
 Biography and bibliography (in French), on the Bibliothèque interuniversitaire de Médecine website

1580 births
1656 deaths